The MacDonnell Ranges, or Tjoritja in Arrernte, is a mountain range located in southern Northern Territory. The mountain range contains many spectacular gaps and gorges as well as areas of Aboriginal significance.

The ranges were named after Sir Richard MacDonnell (the Governor of South Australia at the time) by John McDouall Stuart, whose 1860 expedition reached them in April of that year. The Horn Expedition investigated the ranges as part of the scientific expedition into central Australia. Other explorers of the range included David Lindsay and John Ross.

The MacDonnell Ranges were often depicted in the paintings of Albert Namatjira.

Geography
The headwaters of the Todd, Finke and Sandover rivers form in the MacDonnell Ranges. The range is crossed by the Australian Overland Telegraph Line, the Stuart Highway and the Adelaide–Darwin rail corridor at the Heavitree Gap, a water gap created by the Todd River, at the southern entrance to Alice Springs.

Geology

Some 300-350 million years ago a mountain building event created the MacDonnell Ranges. Since that time, folding, faulting and erosion have shaped the range and created numerous gaps and gorges. The ranges are composed of many rock types, but are most famous for their red quartzite peaks and gorges. Other rock types include granite, limestone, sandstone and siltstone. Some of the valleys of the range contain fossil evidence of the inland sea that once covered central Australia.

Ecology
Part of the Central Ranges xeric scrub ecoregion of dry scrubby grassland, the ranges are home to a large number of endemic species that includes the centralian tree frog Litoria gilleni.  This is mostly due to the micro climates that are found around the cold rock pools.

Tourist attractions
The West MacDonnell National Park was established in 1984 to protect the numerous parks and reserves of the range, including internal residents inside the range. It also facilitated the development of the Larapinta Trail.

To the east of Alice Springs, within an hour's drive, are sites important to the local Arrernte people, many of which contain examples of Aboriginal rock art. These include Emily Gap, Jessie Gap, Trephina Gorge and N’Dhala Gorge.

To the west of Alice Springs is the Larapinta Trail—a world-class, long distance bush walking trail that runs  along the backbone of the range. Along the trail are Simpsons Gap, Standley Chasm, Ellery Creek Big Hole, Serpentine Gorge, Ochre Pits, Ormiston Pound, Redbank Gorge, Glen Helen Gorge, Mount Sonder and Mount Giles.

Gallery

See also

 Geography of Australia
 List of mountains in Australia
 Pine Gap
 Western Arrernte
 N'Dhala Gorge Nature Park
 Heavitree Gap

References

External links
 Arrernte art

IBRA regions
Mountain ranges of the Northern Territory
Biogeography of the Northern Territory